Gaya Airport  is an airport serving Gaya, Dosso Region, Niger.  It is located 2 kilometres (1.2 mi) west of the city centre.

See also
Transport in Niger

References

 OurAirports - Niger
  Great Circle Mapper - Gaya
 Gaya Airport
 Google Earth

External links

Airports in Niger